Evrard or Évrard may refer to

People
 Évrard d'Espinques, French manuscript illuminator
 Ray Evrard (1895-1974), American lawyer
 St. Evrard, another name of St. Eberhard of Friuli